Red Hat Enterprise Linux derivatives are Linux distributions that are based on the source code of Red Hat Enterprise Linux (RHEL).

History

Red Hat Linux was one of the first and most popular Linux distributions. This was largely because, while a paid-for supported version was available, a freely downloadable version was also available. Since the only difference between the paid-for option and the free option was support, a great number of people chose to use the free version.

Red Hat made the decision to split its Red Hat Linux product into two: Red Hat Enterprise Linux for customers who were willing to pay for it, and Fedora that was made available free of charge but gets updates for every release for approximately 13 months.

Fedora has its own beta cycle and has some issues fixed by contributors who include Red Hat staff. However, its quick and nonconservative release cycle means it might not be suitable for some users. Fedora is somewhat a test-bed for Red Hat, allowing them to beta test their new features before they get included in Red Hat Enterprise Linux. Since the release of Fedora, Red Hat has no longer made binary versions of its commercial product available free-of-charge.

Motivations

Red Hat does not make a compiled version of its Enterprise Linux product available for free download. However, as the license terms on which it is mostly based explicitly stipulate, Red Hat has made the entire source code available in RPM format via their network of servers. The availability of the complete source code of the distribution in RPM format makes it relatively easy to recompile the entire distribution. Several distributions were created that took Red Hat's source code, recompiled it, and released it.

Features

The Red Hat Enterprise Linux derivatives generally include the union set, which is included in the different versions of RHEL. The version numbers are typically identical to the ones featured in RHEL; as such, the free versions maintain binary compatibility with the paid-for version, which means software intended for RHEL typically runs just as well on a free version. Relatively few changes need to be made to the distributions. However, RHEL used to use Red Hat's own Up2date technology for providing updates. For convenience, several of the free alternatives ship with yum replacing up2date, something that makes providing mirrors for upgrades significantly easier. Red Hat Enterprise Linux 5 and above releases use yum as their native system for providing updates, with up2date being just its front end.

Legal aspects

Free redistributions are expressly permitted by the GNU General Public License upon which Red Hat's distributions are based.  However, to avoid misrepresentation of Red Hat's trademark, material in the original distribution covered by the trademark must be stripped off or removed from the redistribution.

Where distributions (e.g., CentOS) have not been deemed sufficiently thorough in removing references to Red Hat, they have received warnings from Red Hat's legal counsel. CentOS received such a notice seeking to have it remove all mention of Red Hat's asserted trademarks from their website and their distribution. CentOS previously referred to Red Hat as the "Upstream Vendor", or more formally as a "Prominent North American Enterprise Linux vendor".

Notable Red Hat Enterprise Linux derivatives
 AlmaLinux – A 100% Community-owned and governed replacement for CentOS developed under the 501(c)(6) non-profit, AlmaLinux OS Foundation.
 Bull's XBAS or bullx – (for high-performance computing)
 CentOS – (version 7 gets maintenance updates until 2024-06-30)
 ClearOS
 ClefOS – a port of CentOS for IBM Z by Sine Nomine Associates.
 EulerOS – certified to The Open Group's UNIX 03 standard.
 EuroLinux -  created by EuroLinux company freely distributed in the open core model. Besides standard paid support company offers forking and rebuilding from sources for special purposes. Previous versions were built on top of Scientific Linux.
 Inspur K-UX – certified to The Open Group's UNIX 03 standard.
 MIRACLE LINUX – an enterprise Linux distribution developed by Cybertrust Japan.
 Oracle Linux – free to download, distribute and use with public access to the latest errata and patches from the Oracle Linux yum server. Optional paid support subscriptions are available from Oracle.
 RedSleeve Linux – an ARMv5 and ARMv6 build of EL6, EL7, EL8 an EL9 for older devices that don't meet the requirements for other ARM EL distributions 
 Rocky Linux – a community-supported replacement for CentOS initiated by CentOS founder Gregory Kurtzer.
 Redpesk - a secure embedded Linux targeting industrial connected devices with very long term support make by IoT.bzh 
 Scientific Linux – (version 7 gets maintenance updates until 2024-06-30)
 SME Server – made by the Koozali Foundation (version 10 based on CentOS 7 gets maintenance updates until 2024-06-30)
 Springdale Linux –  formerly PUIAS Linux is a complete operating system for desktops and servers, built by compiling the source packages for Red Hat Enterprise Linux.
 VzLinux –  made by Virtuozzo and optimized to run in containers, virtual machines or on bare-metal servers.
 Circle Linux –  an open source and community-driven distribution aiming for full compatibility.

Appliance-oriented derivatives based on RHEL:
 Amazon.com Amazon Linux AMI – RHEL7 userland with a linux-xen-kernel
 Google Search Appliance – derived from CentOS
 VMware ESX's Service Console software

Distributions which have ceased production or outdated:
 CAOS Linux – (multiple lineage)
 Fermi Linux – a.k.a. Fermi Scientific Linux, derived from Scientific Linux with additional software specific for the Fermilab research facilities
 Rocks Cluster Distribution – derived from RHEL (earlier versions) and CentOS (recent releases)
 ROSA Enterprise Linux Server
 StartCom Enterprise Linux
 White Box Enterprise Linux – No formal announcement but no longer actively developed
 Yellow Dog Linux

See also

List of commercial products based on Red Hat Enterprise Linux
Long-term support

References

External links
 Revisiting RHEL Clones
 rhel-forks

Lists of operating systems
Red Hat software

ru:Категория:Дистрибутивы семейства RedHat